The Commander British Forces in Hong Kong (CBF) was a senior British Army officer who acted as Military Advisor to the Governor of Hong Kong and was in charge of the Hong Kong British Forces. The officeholder of this post concurrently assumed the office of the Lieutenant Governor of Hong Kong before the abolition of the position.

Structure
The Governor of Hong Kong, being a representative of the British sovereign, was the Commander-in-Chief of the British Forces and Vice Admiral in the Crown colony (then British Dependent Territories).

The Governor was advised by the Commander British Forces in Hong Kong (CBF) on all military actions.  During the 1980s and 1990s, the CBF was normally a career Major General or Lieutenant General from the British Army. Until 1966, the CBF was an ex officio member of the Legislative Council.

Commanders
Commanders have included:

Commander British Forces in Hong Kong
1843–1848 Major-General George d'Aguilar
1848–1851 Major-General William Staveley
1851–1854 Major-General William Jervois
Commander British Troops in China and Hong Kong
1854–1857 Major-General Sir Robert Garrett
1857–1858 Major-General Thomas Ashburnham
1858–1859 Major-General Sir Charles van Straubenzee
1860–1861 Major-General Sir James Grant
1861–1862 Major-General Sir John Michel
1862–1863 Major-General Sir Charles Staveley
1863–1864 Major-General William Brown
1864–1867 Major-General Sir Philip Guy
1867–1869 Major-General James Brunker
Commander British Troops in China, Hong Kong, and the Straits Settlements
1869–1874 Major-General Henry Whitfield
1874–1878 Lieutenant General Sir Francis Colborne
1878–1882 Lieutenant General Edward Donovan
1882–1885 Lieutenant General John Sargent
1885–1889 Lieutenant General Sir William Cameron
Commander British Troops in China and Hong Kong
1889–1890 Major-General Sir James Edwards
1890–1895 Major-General Sir George Barker
1895–1898 Major-General Sir Wilsone Black
1898–1903 Major-General Sir William Gascoigne

Commander British Troops in Southern China
1903–1906 Major-General Villiers Hatton
1906–1910 Major-General Robert Broadwood
1910–1913 Major-General Sir Charles Anderson
1913–1915 Major-General Francis Kelly

Commander British Troops in Northern China
1900–1901 Major-General Sir Alfred Gaselee
1901–1903 Major-General O'Moore Creagh
1901–1906 Brigadier-General Francis Ventris (major-general from October 1903)
1906–1910 Brigadier-General Wallscourt Waters
1910–1914 Brigadier-General Edward Cooper
1914–1915 Brigadier-General Nathaniel Barnardiston (major-general from February 1915)

Commander British Forces in China
1915–1921 Major-General Francis Ventris
1921–1922 Major-General George Kirkpatrick
1922–1925 Major-General Sir John Fowler

Commander British Troops in Southern China
1925–1929 Major-General Charles Luard
1929–1932 Major-General James Sandilands

Commander British Troops in Northern China
Jan–Dec 1927 Major-General John Duncan (also Shanghai Defence Force)
1927–1929 Major-General Alexander Wardrop

Commander British Troops in China
1932–1935 Lieutenant-General Oswald Borrett
1935–1938 Major-General Arthur Bartholomew
1938–1941 Major-General Edward Grasett
Aug–Dec 1941 Major-General Christopher Maltby
Note from 1941 to 1945 Hong Kong was under Japanese occupation
Commander British Forces in Hong Kong
1945–1946 Major-General Sir Francis Festing
1946–1948 Major-General Sir George Erskine
1948–1949 Major-General Francis Matthews
Jun–Sep 1949 Lieutenant-General Sir Francis Festing
1949–1951 Lieutenant-General Sir Robert Mansergh
1951–1952 Major-General Geoffrey Evans
1952–1954 Major-General Terence Airey
1954–1955 Lieutenant-General Cecil Sugden
1955–1957 Lieutenant-General Sir William Stratton
1957–1960 Lieutenant-General Sir Edric Bastyan
1960–1961 Lieutenant-General Sir Roderick McLeod
1961–1963 Lieutenant-General Sir Reginald Hewetson
1963–1964 Lieutenant-General Sir Richard Craddock
1964–1966 Lieutenant-General Sir Denis O'Connor
1966–1968 Lieutenant-General Sir John Worsley
1968–1970 Lieutenant-General Sir Basil Eugster
1970–1973 Lieutenant-General Sir Richard Ward
1973–1976 Lieutenant-General Sir Edwin Bramall
1976–1978 Lieutenant-General Sir John Archer
1978–1980 Major-General Sir Roy Redgrave
1980–1982 Major-General John Chapple
1982–1985 Major-General Derek Boorman
1985–1987 Major-General Anthony Boam
1987–1989 Major-General Garry Johnson
1989–1992 Major General Peter Duffell
1992–1994 Major-General John Foley
1994–1997 Major-General Bryan Dutton

Residences

 Flagstaff House, 1840s–1978
 Headquarters House, 1978–1997

See also

 Lieutenant Governor of Hong Kong
 Commander of Hong Kong Garrison, People's Liberation Army of the People's Republic of China

References

Senior appointments of the British Army
Defunct positions of the Hong Kong Government
1843 establishments in Hong Kong
1997 disestablishments in Hong Kong